The Western Bloc, also known as the Free Bloc, the Capitalist Bloc, the American Bloc, and the NATO Bloc, was a coalition of countries that were officially allied with the United States during the Cold War of 1947–1991. While the NATO member states, in Western Europe and North America, were pivotal to the bloc, it included many other countries, in the broader Asia-Pacific region, Middle East, Latin America, and Africa with histories of anti-Soviet, anti-communist and, in some cases anti-socialist, ideologies and policies. As such, the bloc was opposed to the political systems and foreign policies of communist countries, which were centered on the Soviet Union, other members of the Warsaw Pact and, usually, the People's Republic of China. The name "Western bloc" emerged in response to, and as the antithesis of, its communist counterpart: the Eastern bloc. Throughout the Cold War, the governments and the Western media were more inclined to refer to themselves as the Free World or the First World, whereas the Eastern bloc was often referred to as the "Communist World" or, less commonly, the "Second World".

1947–1991 Western Bloc associations

NATO

 Belgium*
 Canada*
 Denmark*
 France*
 FR Germany (1955–1990)
 Greece (from 1952)
 Iceland*
 Italy*
 Luxembourg*
 Netherlands*
 Norway*
 Portugal*
 Spain (from 1982)
 Turkey (from 1952)
 United Kingdom*
 United States*

Five Eyes
 Australia
 Canada
 New Zealand
 United Kingdom
 United States

ANZUS
 Australia
 New Zealand
 United States

Anti-Soviet communist or socialist states (until 1989)
China (from 1978)
Democratic Kampuchea (from 1978)
CGDK (from 1982)
Romania (from 1964)
Yugoslavia (from 1948)

Compact of Free Association
Marshall Islands
Micronesia
Palau
United States

METO, Baghdad Pact, CENTO (until 1979)
 Iran (until 1979)
 Iraq (until 1958)
 Pakistan (until 1979)
 Turkey (until 1979)
 United Kingdom (until 1979)

Rio Treaty

Argentina
Bahamas (from 1982)
Bolivia (until 2005)
Brazil
Chile
Colombia
Costa Rica
Cuba (1902–1959) (until 1959)
Dominican Republic (until 1990)
Ecuador (until 2012)
El Salvador
Guatemala
Honduras
Mexico 
Nicaragua (until 1979)
Panama
Paraguay
Peru
Trinidad and Tobago (from 1967)
United States
Uruguay
Venezuela (until 1999, rejoined 2019 by Juan Guaidó)

SEATO

 Australia
 Cambodia (until 1956) 
 Khmer Republic (1970–1975)
 France
 Laos (until 1975)
 New Zealand
 Pakistan
 Philippines
 Republic of Vietnam (until 1975)
 Thailand
 United Kingdom
 United States

Middle East/North Africa Region

Afghanistan (2001–2021)
Bahrain
Egypt (from 1979)
Iran (until 1979)
Iraq (until 1990)
Israel
Jordan
Kuwait
Lebanon 
Libya (before 1969, from 2011)
Morocco
Oman
Qatar
Saudi Arabia
Somalia (from 1977)
Sudan (1971-1985, 2019-2021)
Syrian opposition
Tunisia
Turkey (until 2009)
United Arab Emirates
Yemen (Hadi government)
North Yemen (1962–1990)

Asia, Southeast Asian and Oceania Partners

Japan
South Korea
Republic of China (Taiwan)
Australia
New Zealand
India
Pakistan
Bhutan
Indonesia
Philippines
Thailand
Malaysia
Singapore
Brunei (from 1984)
Vietnam (from 1995)

Others
Belarus (1991–1994)
Bosnia and Herzegovina
Cyprus
Ethiopia (before 1974)
Khmer Republic (1970–1975)
Kosovo
Russia (1991–1999)
South Africa
West Berlin
Zaire

Post-1991 Western-aligned associations

NATO

 Albania (from 2009)
 Belgium*
 Bulgaria (from 2004)
 Canada*
 Croatia (from 2009)
 Czech Republic (from 1999)
 Denmark*
 Estonia (from 2004)
 France*
 Germany*
 Greece*
 Hungary (from 1999)
 Iceland*
 Italy*
 Latvia (from 2004)
 Lithuania (from 2004)
 Luxembourg*
 Montenegro (from 2017)
 Netherlands*
 North Macedonia (from 2020)
 Norway*
 Poland (from 1999)
 Portugal*
 Romania (from 2004)
 Slovakia (from 2004)
 Slovenia (from 2004)
 Spain*
 Turkey*
 United Kingdom*
 United States*

Major non-NATO ally (MNNA)

 Australia (from 1987)
 Egypt (from 1987)
 Israel (from 1987)
 Japan (from 1987)
 South Korea (from 1987)
 Jordan (from 1996)
 New Zealand (from 1997)
 Argentina (from 1998)
 Bahrain (from 2002)
 Philippines (from 2003)
 Thailand (from 2003)
 Republic of China (Taiwan) (de facto) (from 2003)
 Kuwait (from 2004)
 Morocco (from 2004)
 Pakistan (from 2004)
 IR Afghanistan (2012–2021)
 Tunisia (from 2015)
 Brazil (from 2019)
 Colombia (from 2022)
 Qatar (from 2022)

Middle Eastern Partners

Bahrain
Egypt
Iraq (from 2004)
Israel
Jordan
Kuwait
Morocco
Qatar
Saudi Arabia
Sudan
Tunisia
United Arab Emirates

Asia, South East Asian and Oceania Partners

Japan
South Korea
Republic of China (Taiwan)
Thailand
New Zealand
Philippines
Australia
India
Pakistan
Indonesia
Mongolia
Malaysia
Brunei
Bhutan
Singapore
Vietnam

Inter-American Partners

Argentina
Brazil
Chile
Colombia
Costa Rica
Dominican Republic
Ecuador
El Salvador
Guatemala
Honduras
Mexico
Panama
Paraguay
Peru
Uruguay

Quadrilateral Security Dialogue
United States
India
Australia
Japan

Others
Armenia (from 2018)
Austria
Bosnia and Herzegovina
Botswana
Cyprus
Finland
Georgia
Ghana
Ireland
Ivory Coast
Kenya
Kosovo
Malta
Mauritius
Moldova
Sweden
South Africa
Uganda
Tanzania

See also 

 List of Western Bloc defectors
Martin and Mitchell defection
List of American and British defectors in the Korean War
 Allies of World War II
 Axis powers
 Eastern Bloc
 Free World
 First World
 Second World
 Third World
 Operation Condor
 Western betrayal
 Western world

Notes

Sources
Matloff, Maurice. Makers of Modern Strategy. Ed. Peter Paret. Princeton: Princeton UP, 1971. 702.
Kissinger, Henry. Diplomacy. New York: Simon & Schuster, 1994. 447,454.
Lewkowicz, Nicolas. The United States, the Soviet Union and the Geopolitical Implications of the Origins of the Cold War New York and London: Anthem Press, 2018. 

Cold War organizations
Cold War terminology
Country classifications
Politics by region
Politics of Europe
Spheres of influence